The following elections occurred in the year 1972.

Africa
 1972 Gambian general election
 1972 Guinea-Bissau legislative election
 1972 Malagasy presidential election
 1972 Swazi parliamentary election

Asia
 1972 North Korean parliamentary election
 1972 Republic of China legislative election (Taiwan)
 1972 Singaporean general election
 1972 Taiwan presidential election
 1972 Japanese general election

Europe
 1972 Dutch general election
 European Economic Community (EEC) enlargement: 
 Referendum in Denmark (2 October) 
 Referendum in France
 Referendum in Ireland (10 Mai) 
 Referendum in Norway
 1972 Finnish parliamentary election
 1972 West German federal election
 1972 Gibraltar general election
 1972 Italian general election
 1972 Polish legislative election
 United Kingdom 
 1972 Kingston-upon-Thames by-election
 1972 Merthyr Tydfil by-election
 1972 Rochdale by-election
 1972 Southwark by-election
 1972 Sutton and Cheam by-election
 1972 Uxbridge by-election

North America
 1972 Nicaraguan Constitutional Assembly election
 1972 Panamanian parliamentary election
 1972 Panamanian presidential election
 1972 Salvadoran legislative election
 1972 Salvadoran presidential election

Canada
 1972 Canadian federal election
 1972 Brantford municipal election
 1972 British Columbia general election
 1972 British Columbia time referendum
 1972 Newfoundland general election
 1972 Ontario municipal elections
 1972 Ottawa municipal election
 1972 Toronto municipal election

Caribbean
 1972 Jamaican general election

United States
 1972 United States presidential election
 1972 United States Senate elections
 1972 United States House of Representatives elections

California
 United States House of Representatives elections in California, 1972
 United States presidential election in California, 1972

Delaware
 United States Senate election in Delaware, 1972

Illinois
 United States Senate election in Illinois, 1972

Louisiana
 1971–72 Louisiana gubernatorial election

Massachusetts
 United States presidential election in Massachusetts, 1972
 United States Senate election in Massachusetts, 1972

Nebraska
 United States Senate election in Nebraska, 1972

North Carolina
 United States Senate election in North Carolina, 1972
 United States presidential election in North Carolina, 1972

South Carolina
 United States House of Representatives elections in South Carolina, 1972
 United States Senate election in South Carolina, 1972

United States House of Representatives
 United States House of Representatives elections in South Carolina, 1972
 United States House of Representatives elections in California, 1972

United States Senate
 1972 United States Senate elections
 United States Senate election in Delaware, 1972
 United States Senate election in Illinois, 1972
 United States Senate election in Nebraska, 1972
 United States Senate election in North Carolina, 1972
 United States Senate election in South Carolina, 1972

Washington (U.S. state)
 1972 Washington gubernatorial election
 Washington Initiative 276 (1972)

Oceania
 1972 Cook Islands general election
 1972 Fijian general election
 1972 New Zealand general election

Australia
 1972 Australian federal election
 1972 Tasmanian state election

See also

 
1972
Elections